Eduard Bass, born Eduard Schmidt, (1 January 1888 – 2 October 1946) was a Czech prose writer, journalist, singer, and actor.

Born in Prague, he worked as a singer, journalist and cabaret director from 1910. From 1921 he was an editor of the newspaper Lidové noviny and from 1933 its editor-in-chief.

Among his works, the best known today is the humorous novel for youths Klapzubova jedenáctka (Klapzuba's Eleven, 1922, about an invincible football team of 11 brothers) and the novel Cirkus Humberto (Circus Humberto, 1941, an epic saga about people working in circuses). He died in Prague in 1946.

See also 
 List of Czech writers

External links 
 
 Short biography
  

1888 births
1946 deaths
20th-century journalists
20th-century male writers
20th-century novelists
Burials at Vyšehrad Cemetery
Czech journalists
Czech male writers
Czech novelists
Czechoslovak male singers
Male actors from Prague
Male novelists
People from the Kingdom of Bohemia